Goran Kovačević may refer to:

Goran Kovačević (Serbian politician)
Goran Kovačević (musician)
Goran Kovačević (footballer)